Collagen alpha-6(IV) chain is a protein that in humans is encoded by the COL4A6 gene.

This gene encodes one of the six subunits of type IV collagen, the major structural component of basement membranes. Like the other members of the type IV collagen gene family, this gene is organized in a head-to-head conformation with another type IV collagen gene, alpha 5 type IV collagen, so that the gene pair shares a common promoter. Deletions in the alpha 5 gene that extend into the alpha 6 gene result in diffuse leiomyomatosis accompanying the X-linked Alport syndrome caused by the deletion in the alpha 5 gene. Two splice variants have been identified for this gene.

References

Further reading

Collagens